HD 2454 is a probable binary star system in the zodiac constellation of Pisces. With an apparent visual magnitude of 6.04, it is near the lower limit of visibility to the naked eye under good seeing conditions. An annual parallax shift of 26.3 mas as measured from Earth's orbit provides a distance estimate of 124 light years. It has a relatively high proper motion, traversing the celestial sphere at a rate of 0.208 arcseconds per year, and is moving closer to the Sun with a heliocentric radial velocity of −10 km/s.

It has an estimated 1.23 times the mass of the Sun and 1.6 times the Sun's radius. The star is about 1.9 billion years old with a rotation period of around three days. It is radiating 4.6 times the Sun's luminosity from its photosphere at an effective temperature of around 6,508 K.

HD 2454 was the first star to be identified as a Barium dwarf, by Tomkin et al. (1989), and is the brightest such object. It displays a mild overabundance of the element barium, which is hypothesized to have been accreted when an unresolved white dwarf companion was passing through the asymptotic giant branch (RGB) stage.

The visible component displays significant overabundances of three s-process peak elements that are generated during the RGB phase, as well as a mild overabundance of carbon. In contrast, it shows severe depletion of lithium and beryllium, as well as a notable underabundance of boron. The surface abundances of these lighter elements may have been altered during the mass transfer process, having been previously consumed in the core region of the companion.

References

F-type main-sequence stars
Barium stars

Pisces (constellation)
Durchmusterung objects
0107
Piscium, 88
002454
002235